Golubi is a rural locality (a village) in Turovetskoye Rural Settlement, Mezhdurechensky District, Vologda Oblast, Russia. The population was 1 as of 2002.

Geography 
Golubi is located 253 km northeast of Shuyskoye (the district's administrative centre) by road. Kozhukhovo is the nearest rural locality.

References 

Rural localities in Mezhdurechensky District, Vologda Oblast